Representability in mathematics can refer to
 the existence of a representable functor in category theory
 Birch's theorem about the representability of zero by odd degree forms
 Brauer's theorem on the representability of zero by forms over certain fields in sufficiently many variables
 Brown's representability theorem in homotopy theory

See also 
 Representation theory